Kapranov is a Russian masculine surname, its feminine counterpart is Kapranova. It may refer to
Mikhail Kapranov (born 1962), Russian mathematician
Olga Kapranova (born 1987), Russian individual rhythmic gymnast
Roman Kapranov (born 1983), Russian Paralympian athlete

Russian-language surnames